John Chalmers (1885 – unknown) was a Scottish footballer who played in the Football League for Stoke and Woolwich Arsenal.

Career
Chalmers was born in Beith and started his career with Rutherglen Glencairn before turning professional with Rangers. He moved to Stoke City in January 1906 and made an instant impact scoring five goals in five games. He was the club's top scorer in the 1906–07 season, though they were relegated from the First Division. In all he scored 19 goals in 40 appearances but was released in the summer of 1907. He had a spell at Southern League Bristol Rovers, before moving back north of the border to join Clyde in November 1908. In 1909–10 Chalmers was in Clyde's side that reached the Scottish Cup final, which they eventually lost to Dundee in the second replay.

In October 1910 Chalmers was tempted south of the border again, signing for Woolwich Arsenal. Arsenal had been ailing in the First Division; they had only scored twice in their first six matches of the 1910–11 season and were languishing in seventeenth place. Chalmers made his debut against Bradford City on 8 October 1910 and soon had an immediate impact on Arsenal's season, scoring fifteen league goals (and one in the FA Cup, making him the club's top scorer with sixteen), as Arsenal finished a comfortable tenth.

Chalmers was a first-team starter the next season, but lost his place to Alf Common, who had been moved from inside-forward to centre-forward. Chalmers was unhappy playing for Arsenal's reserves and was transferred to Morton in March 1912.

Career statistics
Source:

References
Specific

General
 

1885 births
Year of death missing
Scottish footballers
Footballers from North Ayrshire
Association football forwards
Rangers F.C. players
Beith F.C. players
Rutherglen Glencairn F.C. players
Stoke City F.C. players
Bristol Rovers F.C. players
Clyde F.C. players
Arsenal F.C. players
Greenock Morton F.C. players
English Football League players
Scottish Football League players
Scottish Junior Football Association players
People from Beith